My Ishmael is a 1997 novel by Daniel Quinn that is a followup to Ishmael. With its time frame largely simultaneous with Ishmael, its plot precedes the fictional events of its 1996 spiritual successor, The Story of B. Like Ishmael, My Ishmael largely revolves around a Socratic dialogue between the sapient gorilla, Ishmael, and a student, involving his philosophy regarding tribal society. Ishmael's pupil in My Ishmael, however, is a twelve-year-old female protagonist, Julie Gerchak, and the plot details not only her visits to Ishmael but also her journey to Africa in order to prepare Ishmael's return to the wilds of his homeland.

Plot summary
My Ishmael is presented as the final copy of a book published by Julie Gerchak, who has herself read Ishmael. At the time she begins writing, Julie is sixteen, though during the main plot of her story she is merely twelve years old: "a plucky, resourceful, near-genius with a wobbly home life." Like the narrator of Ishmael, Julie discovers a message in her city's newspaper, which advertises a teacher seeking someone who wishes to save the world. Julie arrives at Room 105 of the Fairfield Building to discover a gorilla, Ishmael, whom she is able to communicate with telepathically. When she asks Ishmael if he will teach her, he is initially ambivalent due to her very young age, though this frustrates Julie and her arguments convince Ishmael that she may indeed be open to his maieutic teaching style.

First, Ishmael asks Julie to reflect on why she came to him. She answers that it may be related to her fears about her society's destructive impact on itself and the environment. When urged to tell a story about what she expects to learn with Ishmael, Julie describes a daydream in which she is recruited to go on a space mission to visit other planets and thereby learn solutions around the galaxy for Earth's problems. Next, Ishmael launches into a discussion of "Mother Culture" (the personified notion of the influence of our cultural mythology), our civilization's delusion that our intelligence is a curse inherently propelling us toward making terrible decisions, and our culture's fallacy that all human societies (or, at least, all the "civilized" ones) developed out of a state of foraging to a superior state of farming, neglecting the tribes all over the world who continue the foraging lifestyle. Ishmael refers to humanity in terms of Takers (members of the single, world-dominating culture that destroys other peoples or forces them to assimilate) and Leavers (members of the countless cultures who lived or continue to live in tribal societies). He also examines evolutionary processes and how they tend to maintain behaviors that best sustain some particular gene pool and enforce a sort of equilibrium in which no single organism or group of organisms overwhelms the competition for natural resources. He claims that Takers depart from this self-sustaining balance in that they keep their resources, primarily food, under "lock and key." This, he claims, creates hierarchical social structures in which the cooperative ethos is lost, resulting in distress and conflict within the society, such as crime, suicide, poverty, famine, and senseless violence. He argues that although Taker societies flourish in terms of material wealth—such as technological advancement and greater scientific progress—they fail utterly with regard to what he believes to be actual wealth: the sense of belonging and security that hold together the fabric of human tribal societies. Julie ultimately learns that she does not need to travel around the galaxy to see ways that human societies can thrive successfully; she needs only to learn from the successes of tribal life.

Julie visits Ishmael as often as she can and notices a young man sometimes leaving Ishmael's office. Ishmael explains that this is Alan Lomax, who is later revealed to be the previously unnamed narrator of Ishmael. Julie feels an odd distaste for Alan though she never meets him face-to-face. Ishmael maintains both pupils, though his teachings are not necessarily the same for each. With Julie, Ishmael describes how tribes live alongside other tribes, in a state of what he terms "erratic retaliation," meaning that they revenge their neighbors' acts of aggression but also do not behave too predictably. This allows people to compete effectively for resources while not engaging "in mortal combat for every little thing." Furthermore, Ishmael distinguishes erratic retaliation from war, a feature of Taker societies, which he describes so: "Retaliation is giving as good as you get; going to war is conquering people to make them do what you want." Ishmael also outlines his preference for the Leaver (or tribal) notion of law, which is generally unwritten knowledge of how to deal with undesirable behaviors within the tribe. He explains that this is different from the Taker concept of law because since "tribal peoples didn't waste time with laws they knew would be disobeyed, disobedience was not a problem for them. Tribal law didn't outlaw mischief, it spelled out ways to undo mischief, so people were glad to obey it."

Eventually, Ishmael's teachings turn toward the subject of formal education, which he argues is merely a way to keep children out of the work force and is otherwise unnecessary because humans learn on their own, naturally following their own interests and picking up information necessary to operate in their culture. In tribal cultures, this information inherently includes that which is relevant to surviving in the wild by learning to hunt and gather food, as well as easily adopting their culture's values, customs, and so on. In Taker culture, the otherwise automatic process of learning is hindered and convoluted by the institution of formal education, which largely forces students to study topics that they do not apply outside of the classroom and that they therefore largely forget once the information is no longer needed to pass tests or similar evaluations.

When Ishmael asserts that humans must strive to belong to effective and secure communities, Julie asks for concrete examples of how this can be achieved. Ishmael praises the utter strength of human innovation, citing positive examples from the Industrial Revolution, and claims that this will lead and has already led to a diversity of models, including the Sudbury school, the Gesundheit! Institute, and intentional communities. He claims that humans must together create these answers little by little and that innovators in fact build upon prior ideas gradually toward eventual progress. He concludes his teachings with an iteration of his philosophy summed up in a single sentence: "There is no one right way for people to live."

At this point in the story, Julie is introduced to Art "Artie" Owens, born in the Belgian Congo (later Zaire) of the name Makiadi "Adi" Owona. Owens is a friend of Ishmael who has connections to his African homeland and intends to help Ishmael return to the West African jungle. Owens, since a child, was always a naturalist, during which time he was friends with the revolution-minded Mokonzi Nkemi. Owens educated himself as much as he could, studying in Belgium, becoming a dual citizen of Zaire and Belgium, traveling to the United States, and attending Cornell University, where he met the daughter of Ishmael's benefactor and first human companion. Returning to Zaire, Owens participated in Nkemi's revolutionary founding of the Republic of Mabili, now independent from Zaire. Owens's role as minister of the interior lasted only a few months before he realized Nkemi's corrupt dealings with Zaire's President Mobutu in order to keep his fledgling nation alive. Under penalty of death, Owens fled back to the United States and purchased an animal menagerie, which he now plans to use to house Ishmael after Ishmael's eviction from the Fairfield Building, before his trip back to Africa. Ishmael and Owens, however, must use Julie to request Ishmael's entrance into Mabili from its president, Nkemi.

Julie is astounded at first and initially wonders why Ishmael does not ask Alan Lomax to help him instead. However, she eventually agrees to the potentially dangerous five-day trip and begins being drilled on how to act and be wary in African cities and how to converse with Mabili's leaders. In Mabili, Julie speaks to the prime minister who is Owens's estranged brother, Lukombo "Luk" Owona, and then to President Nkemi himself. Posing as an American student who has won an essay-writing contest promising her a trip to Mabili to meet its president, Julie claims that Ishmael is a gorilla famed in the United States who has gained a following of people that she represents and who wish to see him successfully released back into the wild. When Nkemi asks what he will get in return for helping Julie with this favor, she charms Nkemi with a parable asserting that they are bringing back to the land a beloved creature that was once lost.

Julie returns to the U.S. and ultimately hears from Owens that Ishmael's migration to Africa is successful. She hears also about Alan Lomax, who was becoming too attached to Ishmael as a pupil and not seeming to understand his own need to become a teacher. With this in mind, Alan is told that Ishmael has died; such a ploy is regarded as successful, since it motivates Alan to write the book Ishmael in 1992 (in which Ishmael's death is noted near the end). Although Julie wishes to publish her own book—this very story—Owens forbids her from doing so until Mobutu's regime (and with it, Nkemi's) is on the verge of collapse. This is because, according to Alan's Ishmael, Ishmael is dead and so his magnificence will not be taken seriously; Ishmael will not be hunted down by Nkemi, who has heard of Ishmael being in his country, if Ishmael is presumed dead. Finally, however, in 1997 (when Julie is eighteen years old) Owens contacts Julie, telling her that Mobutu's days are numbered and she may finally publish My Ishmael.

Influence
This book was mentioned by James Lee in his list of demands when he took several hostages at the Discovery Channel Headquarters on September 1, 2010.  He demanded the network air daily programs based on the book, specifically content found on pages 207 through 212 (the chapter "Revolutionaries"). Quinn regarded Lee as "a fanatic" who warped his ideas.

Tosin Abasi, founder of rock band Animals as Leaders, claims that My Ishmael was an inspiration for the band's name.

References

1997 American novels
Novels by Daniel Quinn
Fictional gorillas